Pyrausta heliacalis is a moth in the family Crambidae. It was described by Cajetan Felder, Rudolf Felder and Alois Friedrich Rogenhofer in 1875. It is found in Colombia.

References

Moths described in 1875
heliacalis
Moths of South America